Pseudoceros is a genus of the flatworms Platyhelminthes.

Description 
Easily recognized features within the genus include a ruffled pharynx, branched intestines, and tentacles on the leading edge.  The tentacles may act as chemoreceptors and may also have primitive eyes, simple light-sensitive cells, on them. The Polyclad worms are acoelomates and bilaterally symmetrical.

Color is the main identifier within the family Pseudocerotidae to separate it into genera, as it can be difficult to distinguish internal reproductive anatomy between genera. Because of the similarities in body plan and structure, it is assumed that chemical cues are how these organisms can recognize their own species and differentiate between others.

The intense coloring and patterning on these flatworms could be used to camouflage with their surroundings, confuse and elude predators, to communicate with other members of the species, or as aposematism to warn predators of their deadly toxins. The cells and the pigments they contain that are responsible for this coloring have not been well-studied, but one common theory is that they may be ommochrome pigments, although no discoveries have been made to prove this.

Distribution 
Pseudoceros are generally found in tropical and subtropical waters. They are populous in the Indo-Pacific region and have been found as far north as Puget Sound, where Pseudoceros canadensis has been identified, but mostly tend to stay in warmer waters.

Reproduction 
Pseudoceros are simultaneous hermaphrodites and reproduce sexually via random hypodermic insemination through the body tissue. These organisms participate in penis fencing, which is a behavior where the flatworms use their extended penises to stab and inseminate the other, while avoiding becoming inseminated themselves. After successful fertilization, these flatworms are known to lay egg masses on the benthos. Numbers of eggs, egg size, and developmental time vary between species. 

Pseudoceros indicus will display  parental care in the form of brooding activity. Pseudoceros will hatch into Muller's larvae and undergo indirect development and metamorphosis before becoming an adult organism.

History & taxonomy 
Historically, studying flatworms has been a time and labor-intensive job, generally done through live drawings of specimens, preservation of hard parts (which led to the loss of important information pertaining to the soft parts), and very detailed anatomical studies based on serial sections. More recent technological advances have allowed for scientists to combine photomicrography with molecular analyses to more easily study these organisms.  

There is currently no consensus on what the best method of identification for Pseudoceros is. The two main theories are that species can be identified solely based on their color patterns and that species should be identified based on their reproductive organs instead of coloration. Because of this, identification methods vary within the biological community. 

In concordance with the theory that species should be identified based on color patterns, a new method for preserving Pseudoceros samples was developed in 1995 by Cannon and Newman. This method utilizes FCA-PGPP, or Formaldehyde Calcium Acetate-Propylene Glycol, Propylene Phenoxetol, as the fixative. The worms are placed onto filter paper which is placed on top of a frozen layer of the fixative, and this preserves color accurately.

As of 2000, there are 13 genera in the family Pseudocerotidae that comprise an estimated at least 500 species, of which the genus Pseudoceros made up about 75% until the genus Pseudobiceros was separated.

Species 
The following species are recognised in the genus Pseudoceros:

Pseudoceros affinis (Collingwood, 1876)
Pseudoceros agattiensis Dixit, 2019
Pseudoceros albicornus (Stimpson, 1857)
Pseudoceros albomarginatus Hyman, 1959
Pseudoceros asamusiensis Kato, 1939
Pseudoceros astrorum Bulnes & Torres, 2014
Pseudoceros ater Hyman, 1959
Pseudoceros atraviridis (Collingwood, 1876)
Pseudoceros atropurpureus Kato, 1934
Pseudoceros auranticrinis Dixit, Raghunathan & Chandra, 2017
Pseudoceros bicolor Verrill, 1902
Pseudoceros bicuti Ramos-Sanchez, Bahia & Rolando Bastida-Zavala, 2020
Pseudoceros bifasciatus Prudhoe, 1989
Pseudoceros bimarginatus Meixner, 1907
Pseudoceros bipurpureus Dixit, 2021
Pseudoceros bolool Newman & Cannon, 1994
Pseudoceros buskii (Collingwood, 1876)
Pseudoceros caeruleocinctus Hyman, 1959
Pseudoceros caeruleopunctatus Palombi, 1928
Pseudoceros canadensis Hyman, 1953
Pseudoceros cardinalis Haswell, 1907
Pseudoceros cardiosorus (Schmarda, 1859)
Pseudoceros cerebralis (Kelaart, 1858)
Pseudoceros chloreus Marcus, 1949
Pseudoceros clavicornis (Schmarda, 1859)
Pseudoceros coccineus (Stimpson, 1857)
Pseudoceros colemani Prudhoe, 1977
Pseudoceros collingwoodi Laidlaw, 1903
Pseudoceros concinnus (Collingwood, 1876)
Pseudoceros confusus Newman & Cannon, 1995
Pseudoceros contrarius Newman & Cannon, 1995
Pseudoceros corallophilus Hyman, 1954
Pseudoceros cruentus Newman & Cannon, 1998
Pseudoceros devisii Woodworth, 1898
Pseudoceros dimidiatus von Graff, 1893
Pseudoceros dulcis Kelaart, 1858
Pseudoceros duplicinctus Prudhoe, 1989
Pseudoceros exoptatus Kato, 1938
Pseudoceros felis Newman & Cannon, 1994
Pseudoceros ferrugineus (Hyman, 1959)
Pseudoceros flavomaculatus Graff, 1893
Pseudoceros flavomarginatus Laidlaw, 1902
Pseudoceros fulminatus (Stimpson, 1855)
Pseudoceros fuscogriseus Hyman, 1959
Pseudoceros fuscopunctatus Prudhoe, 1977
Pseudoceros fuscus (Kelaart, 1858)
Pseudoceros galatheensis Dixit, Raghunathan & Chandra, 2017
Pseudoceros galaxea Dixit, 2021
Pseudoceros gamblei Laidlaw, 1902
Pseudoceros glaucus Prudhoe, 1989
Pseudoceros goslineri Newman & Cannon, 1994
Pseudoceros gravieri Meixner, 1907
Pseudoceros griseus Hyman, 1959
Pseudoceros guttatomarginatus (Stimpson, 1855)
Pseudoceros habroptilus Hyman, 1959
Pseudoceros haddoni (Laidlaw, 1903)
Pseudoceros hancockanus (Collingwood, 1876)
Pseudoceros harrisi Bolanos, Quiroga, & Litvaitis, 2007
Pseudoceros heronensis Newman & Cannon, 1994
Pseudoceros imitatus Newman & Cannon, 1994
Pseudoceros imperatus Newman & Cannon, 1998
Pseudoceros indicus Newman & Schupp, 2002
Pseudoceros intermittus Newman & Cannon, 1995
Pseudoceros interruptus (Stimpson, 1855)
Pseudoceros irretitus Newman & Cannon, 1998
Pseudoceros japonicus (Stimpson, 1857)
Pseudoceros jebborum Newman & Cannon, 1994
Pseudoceros josei Newman & Cannon, 1998
Pseudoceros juani Bahia et al., 2014
Pseudoceros kelaarti (Collingwood, 1876)
Pseudoceros kentii Graff, 1893
Pseudoceros kylie Newman & Cannon, 1998
Pseudoceros lacteus (Collingwood, 1876)
Pseudoceros lactolimbus Newman & Cannon, 1998
Pseudoceros laingensis Newman & Cannon, 1998
Pseudoceros langamaakensis Faubel, 1983
Pseudoceros laticlavus Newman & Cannon, 1994
Pseudoceros latissimus type A (Schmarda, 1859) 
Pseudoceros leptostictus Bock, 1913 
Pseudoceros limbatus Leuckart, 1828 
Pseudoceros lindae Newman & Cannon, 1994
Pseudoceros liparus Marcus, 1950
Pseudoceros litoralis Bock, 1913
Pseudoceros lividus Prudhoe, 1982
Pseudoceros luteus (Plehn, 1898)
Pseudoceros macroceraeus Schmarda, 1859
Pseudoceros maculatus (Pease, 1860)
Pseudoceros maximum Lang, 1884
Pseudoceros maximus-type A Lang, 1884
Pseudoceros meenae Dixit, Sivaperuman & Raghunathan, 2018
Pseudoceros memoralis Kato, 1938
Pseudoceros mexicanus Hyman, 1953
Pseudoceros microceraeus (Schmarda, 1859)
Pseudoceros micropapillosus Kato, 1934
Pseudoceros monostichos Newman & Cannon, 1994
Pseudoceros montereyensis Hyman, 1953
Pseudoceros mossambicus Prudhoe, 1989	
Pseudoceros mulleri (Delle Chiaje, 1829)
Pseudoceros niger (Stimpson, 1857)
Pseudoceros nigrocinctus (Schmarda, 1859)
Pseudoceros nigropunctatus Dixit, Raghunathan & Chandra, 2017
Pseudoceros nipponicus Kato, 1944
Pseudoceros ouini Newman & Cannon, 1994
Pseudoceros paradoxus Bock, 1927
Pseudoceros paralaticlavus Newman & Cannon, 1994
Pseudoceros periaurantius Newman & Cannon, 1994
Pseudoceros periphaeus Bock, 1913
Pseudoceros peripurpureus Newman & Cannon, 1994
Pseudoceros perviolaceus (Schmarda, 1859)
Pseudoceros pius Kato, 1938
Pseudoceros pleurostictus Bock, 1913
Pseudoceros punctatus Laidlaw, 1902
Pseudoceros purpureus (Kelaart, 1858)
Pseudoceros rawlinsonae Bolanos, Quiroga, & Litvaitis, 2007
Pseudoceros regalus Laidlaw, 1903
Pseudoceros reticulatus Yeri & Kaburaki, 1918
Pseudoceros rubellus Laidlaw, 1903
Pseudoceros rubronanus Newman & Cannon, 1998
Pseudoceros rubrotentaculatus Kaburaki, 1923
Pseudoceros sagamianus Kato, 1937
Pseudoceros sapphirinus Newman & Cannon, 1994
Pseudoceros scintillatus Newman & Cannon, 1994
Pseudoceros scriptus Newman & Cannon, 1998
Pseudoceros stellans Dixit, 2019
Pseudoceros stimpsoni Newman & Cannon, 1998
Pseudoceros striatus Kelaart, 1858
Pseudoceros susanae Newman & Anderson, 1997
Pseudoceros texanus Hyman, 1955
Pseudoceros tigrinus Laidlaw, 1902
Pseudoceros tomiokaensis Kato, 1938
Pseudoceros tristriatus Hyman, 1959
Pseudoceros velutinus (Blanchard, 1847)
Pseudoceros verecundus Newman & Cannon, 1994
Pseudoceros vinosus Meixner, 1907
Pseudoceros vishnui Dixit, Raghunathan & Chandra, 2017
Pseudoceros yessoensis Kato, 1937
Pseudoceros zebra (Leuckart, 1828)
Pseudoceros zeylanicus (Kelaart, 1858)

References

External links 

Turbellaria genera